Muni Shri 108 Pranamsagar Ji Maharaj is a Digambara monk.

Biography
Muni Pranamsagar is a Digambara monk who visited Goa in 2015 for the first time after thousands of years since any Digambara monk visited the state and gained 150 new followers. The state then became the place for his Chaturmas of the year 2015.

References

Indian Jain monks
21st-century Indian Jains
21st-century Jain monks
21st-century Indian monks
1972 births
Living people